Pope Alexander III (r. 1159–81) created 68 cardinals in fifteen consistories he held throughout his pontificate. This included the elevation of his two future successors Urban III and Clement III and he also elevated a cardinal whom he later named as a saint.

18 February 1160
 Milo

1163
 Konrad von Wittelsbach
 Antonio
 Manfredo O.S.B.
 Ugo Ricasoli
 Oderisio O.S.B. Cas.

1164
 Ugo Pierleoni Can. Reg.
 Ottone
 Benerede O.S.B.
 Teodino degli Atti O.S.B.
 Pietro Caetani
 Vitellio O.S.B.
 Girolamo Can. Reg.
 Eguillino

15 December 1165
 Ermanno
 St. Galdino della Sala
 Raniero
 Teodino O.S.B. Cas.
 Pietro de Bono Can. Reg.
 Ermanno
 Bonifazio

1168
 Giovanni O.S.B.
 Rainaldo O.S.B. Cas.

1170
 Odone
 Gérard d'Autun
 Vernavero
 Lesbio Grassi
 Leonato O.S.B.
 Riso

1171
 Ugo Pierleoni Can. Reg.
 Thibaud O.S.B. Clun.
 Lombardo

September 1173
 Laborans
 Pietro
 Guglielmo
 Uberto Crivelli
 Marcello
 Raniero

7 March 1175
 Vibiano
 Gerardo

December 1176
 Pietro
 Tiberio Savelli
 Gandolfo O.S.B.

March 1178
 Pietro
 Pietro
 Matteo Can. Reg.
 Graziano
 Ardoino

22 September 1178
 Ardoino Can. Reg.
 Giovanni
 Bernardo
 Rainier
 Paolo
 Eutichio

December 1178
 Pietro da Pavia O.S.B.
 Rogerio O.S.B. Cas.
 Mathieu d'Anjou
 Herbert of Bosham
 Jacopo

March 1179
 Henri de Marsiac O.Cist.
 Guillaume de Champagne
 Roberto
 Galando
 Ildeberto
 Paolo Scolari
 Tiburzio

1180
 Bernardo
 Rolando Paparoni

See also

Notes and references

Sources

College of Cardinals
Alexander III
12th-century cardinals
12th-century Catholicism
Pope Alexander III
Cardinals created by Pope Alexander III